In Love With Jetts is the second album by American band Antioch Arrow, first issued as a 12" record in 1994 through Gravity Records. The album is noted for its spastic sound, a change in pace compared to the band's previous release The Lady Is A Cat. It is the first recording by the group to feature guitarists Andy Ward and Jeff Winterberg. Ward, as described by vocalist Aaron Montaigne, brought an "avant-garde" guitar playing style to the group's sound.

The album was repressed on vinyl in 1997 with alternative artwork, and is still in print and purchasable through Gravity Records. The album, in its entirety, was also released on the 1997 self-titled compilation album that features the same artwork as the 12" repress. This CD is too in print and available for purchase by Gravity Records.

Track listing

Personnel
Aaron Montaigne – vocals
Jeff Winterberg – guitar
Andy Ward – guitar
Mac Mann – bass
Ron Avila – drums
Matt Anderson – recording

References

1994 albums
1997 albums
Antioch Arrow albums